Alhaji Ahmed Mohammed Ketso is the deputy governor of Niger State.

References

1969 births
Living people
People from Niger State
21st-century Nigerian politicians
Date of birth missing (living people)
Place of birth missing (living people)